Karipande is a village in Alto Zambeze, Moxico, Angola.

Distance to Luena: 600 km
Population: 7,000
Mayor (Soba): Mukumbi Munhau
Relevance: Place of the murder of the "Commander Hoji-ya-Henda" aka José Mendes de Carvalho at the age of 27 years. He was buried near the river Lundoji, about 30 kilometers of the older headquarters of Karipande in the Eastern front/3rd Political-Military Region. (14, April, 1968)

Notes

References
Tor Sellstrom, Liberation in Southern Africa - Regional and Swedish Voices: Interviews from Angola, Mozambique, Namibia, South Africa, Zimbabwe, the Frontline and Sweden, Nordic Africa Institute, 2002, 365 pag. - (pag. 28)
Edward George, The Cuban Intervention in Angola, 1965-1991: From Che Guevara to Cuito Cuanavale, Routledge, 2005, 354 pag. - (pag. 314)
John A. Marcum, The Angolan Revolution: Vol. 2, Exile Politics and Guerrilla Warfare (1962–1976), Cambridge, Massachusetts, and London:: MIT Press, 1978, 473 pag.
Roberto Correia, Angola - Datas e Factos - (5º Volume - 1961/1975), 2002, 376 pag.
Paulo Miguel Júnior, José Mendes de Carvalho (Comandante Hoji Ya Henda) – Um testemunho à sua memória, 2001

External links
 Peace Accords for Angola
(Portuguese) Angola - Datas e Factos
(Portuguese) Jornal de Angola

Populated places in Moxico Province
Municipalities of Angola